The 2014 Notre Dame Fighting Irish football team represented the University of Notre Dame in the 2014 NCAA Division I FBS football season. The team was coached by Brian Kelly and played its home games at Notre Dame Stadium in South Bend, Indiana. They compete as an independent.

The Irish started the season with a 6–0 record, ranked as high as No. 5 in both the AP Poll and the Coaches Poll, but had a collapse in the second half of the season, losing five of their last six games to finish the regular season at 7–5. Notre Dame's defense suffered significant injuries and yielded over 41 points per game over those six games. For the first time in school history, the Irish gave up thirty points or more in seven consecutive contests.

Despite the disappointing season the Irish finished on a high note, upsetting the heavily favored LSU Tigers (8 point favorites) in the Music City Bowl, 31–28. Kicker Kyle Brindza kicked the game-winning field goal as time expired. This was the first win by Notre Dame over a Southeastern Conference (SEC) team since beating the University of Tennessee Volunteers in 2005. This is also Notre Dame's first win over a ranked opponent in a bowl game since 1993, where they defeated No. 6 Texas A&M.

Before the season

Previous season
The Fighting Irish finished the 2013 regular season with an 8–4 record. They beat the Rutgers Scarlet Knights 29–16 in the 2013 Pinstripe Bowl.

2014 NFL draft
The following former Notre Dame players were selected in the 2014 NFL Draft:

Transfers out / departures
Stephon Tuitt, Louis Nix, Troy Niklas and George Atkinson III all chose to forgo their final year of eligibility and enter the 2014 NFL Draft. On April 4, 2014, sophomore cornerback Rashad Kinlaw was dismissed from the team due to violation of team rules. He subsequently left the university following his dismissal from the football program.

Transfers in
Cody Riggs, a defensive back at Florida, announced he would transfer to Notre Dame in June after he received his degree in May 2014. He would be enrolled in a graduate studies program while exhausting his final season of eligibility.

Coaching changes
Chuck Martin left to become the head coach of the Miami RedHawks. Bob Diaco departed to become the head coach of the Connecticut Huskies. Brian VanGorder, formerly the linebackers coach of the NFL's New York Jets, was hired to be the new defensive coordinator and linebackers coach. Matt LaFleur, formerly the quarterbacks coach of the NFL's Washington Redskins, was hired to be the new quarterbacks coach. Mike Denbrock was promoted to offensive coordinator, filling the void left by Martin.

Recruiting class
Brian Kelly received 23 commitments in his fourth full recruiting class including two five-stars: linebacker Nyles Morgan and offensive tackle Quenton Nelson. The class included student-athletes from 14 states.

Personnel

Coaching staff

Roster
The roster is current as of October 8, 2014.

Schedule

Game summaries

Rice

Michigan

In what looks to be the final meeting between Notre Dame and Michigan, Notre Dame defeated Michigan, 31–0, giving the Irish their most lopsided win against the Wolverines. The game ended Michigan's NCAA record of consecutive games without being shut out. (The Wolverines were last shut out in 1984 versus Iowa). Michigan turned the ball over four times, while Notre Dame had no turnovers. Michigan never reached the red zone in this game. Everett Golson went 23 for 34, throwing for 226 yards and three touchdowns for the Irish. Notre Dame went to 2–0 on the year.

Purdue

Syracuse

Stanford

With 1:09 left in the game and Notre Dame facing a 4th and 11 from Stanford's 23 yard line, Everett Golson finds a wide open Ben Koyack in the corner of the endzone to lift Notre Dame over Stanford 17–14. Stanford, the country's number one defense, had been giving up just 198 total yards of offense a game, but Notre Dame piled up 370 yards. Despite the Irish offense moving the ball, multiple mistakes including botched field goal snaps and turnovers in the red zone kept the game close throughout. Notre Dame's defense was dominant, giving up just 204 total yards and had two interceptions. Further, the Irish defense held Stanford to 47 yards rushing – Stanford's fewest rush yards in a game since 2007. With the win, Notre Dame moves to 5–0.

North Carolina

The 6th ranked Irish held off the North Carolina Tar Heels to win in a shootout 50–43. After trailing 14–0 in the 1st, the Irish found some rhythm to score 21 points in a row to take a 21–14 lead. The win marked the first time the Irish put up 50 points against a non-academy team since beating Stanford 57–7 in 2003.

Florida State

The Irish, who were double digit underdogs, looked to score the game-winning touchdown with :13 left after Everett Golson found a wide open Corey Robinson in the endzone. But the Irish were flagged for a pass interference penalty which took the touchdown away and pushed Notre Dame back 10 yards. Irish turned the ball over on the next play. The penalty was considered controversial by some in a game many consider the game of the year between two top 5 teams. Everett Golson showed why many consider him a Heisman candidate by completing 31 of 52 passes for 313 yards and throwing for 3 touchdowns.

Navy

Arizona State

1st quarter scoring: ND – Kyle Brindza 46-yard field goal; ASU – Zane Gonzalez, 47-yard field goal; ASU – Jaelen Strong 13-yard pass from Taylor  Kelly (Gonzalez kick); ASU – Demario Richard 1-yard run (Gonzalez kick)

2nd quarter scoring: ASU – Damarious Randall 59-yard interception (Gonzalez kick); ASU – Cameron Smith 43-yard pass from Kelly (Gonzalez kick); ASU – Gonzalez, 28-yard field goal; ND – Will Fuller 9-yard pass from Everett Golden (Brindza kick)

3rd quarter scoring:

Northwestern

Louisville

For the first time in the history of Notre Dame football, the Irish have given up 30 points or more in six straight game. And for the second week in a row, a missed field goal by kicker Kyle Brindza late in the game dooms the Irish. Notre Dame is now 1–4 in the last 5 games after starting 6–0.

USC

LSU (Music City Bowl)

Rankings

Postseason

Awards
All-Americans

References

Notre Dame
Notre Dame Fighting Irish football seasons
Music City Bowl champion seasons
Notre Dame Fighting Irish football